Manuel Antonio Barreda (born October 8, 1988) is a Mexican-American professional baseball pitcher for the Toros de Tijuana of the Mexican League. He previously played for the Baltimore Orioles of Major League Baseball (MLB). Barreda was drafted by the New York Yankees in the 12th round of the 2007 Major League Baseball draft.

Career

New York Yankees
Barreda was drafted by the New York Yankees in the 12th round, 394th overall, of the 2007 Major League Baseball draft. He made his professional debut with the rookie-level GCL Yankees, recording a 5–0 record and 3.00 ERA in 11 appearances. In 2008, Barreda recorded a 2.65 ERA in 6 games with the team.

Barreda split the 2009 season between the Single-A Charleston RiverDogs and the GCL Yankees, posting a 3.12 ERA in 16 appearances between the two teams. The following year, he split the season between the Low-A Staten Island Yankees and Charleston, recording a cumulative 3.33 ERA in 13 appearances. In 2011, Barreda played in 45 games for Charleston, pitching to a 4–3 record and 4.50 ERA with 82 strikeouts in 74.0 innings of work. For the 2012 season, Barreda played in High-A with the Tampa Yankees, registering a 5–3 record and 3.95 ERA with 60 strikeouts in 57.0 innings pitched. In 2013, Barreda split the year between Tampa and the Double-A Trenton Thunder, logging a 2–3 record and 4.02 ERA in 38 appearances. In 2014, Barreda recorded a 4–1 record and 3.40 ERA in 30 games before he was released by the organization on July 15, 2014.

Milwaukee Brewers
On July 17, 2014, Barreda signed a minor league deal with the Milwaukee Brewers organization. He finished the year with the Double-A Huntsville Stars, pitching to a 1.99 ERA in 17 games. On March 30, 2015, Barreda was released by the Brewers in Spring Training to pursue playing in the Mexican League.

Toros de Tijuana
On April 14, 2015, Barreda signed with the Toros de Tijuana of the Mexican League. Barreda only pitched in 3 games before being suspended by LMP for a controversial contract dispute with another team. He was released so he could sign back with the Milwaukee Brewers.

Milwaukee Brewers (second stint)
On May 20, 2015, Barreda re-signed with the Milwaukee Brewers organization on a new minor league contract. He split the remainder of the year between the High-A Brevard County Manatees and the Double-A Biloxi Shuckers, recording a cumulative 3.10 ERA with 54 strikeouts in 49.1 innings of work. On November 6, 2015, he elected free agency.

Toros de Tijuana (second stint)
On March 25, 2016, Barreda signed with the Toros de Tijuana of the Mexican League for the 2016 season. He made 25 appearances for the Toros, posting a 2–1 record and 3.50 ERA.

Atlanta Braves
On December 22, 2016, Barreda signed a minor league contract with the Atlanta Braves organization. Before the minor league season began, Barreda was loaned to the Toros de Tijuana of the Mexican League. He recorded a 4–7 record and 4.06 ERA in 18 games for Tijuana before being released on August 3 and re-joining the Braves organization the next day. He appeared in 7 games for the Triple-A Gwinnett Braves in 2017, posting a 3–1 record and 1.83 ERA with 33 strikeouts in 39.0 innings pitched.

Toros de Tijuana (third stint)
On March 27, 2018, Barreda was again loaned to the Toros for the 2018 season. He spent the year with Tijuana, posting a 4–1 record and 41 strikeouts in 17 games. On November 2, 2018, he elected free agency and re-signed with the Toros. For the 2019 season, Barreda pitched in 23 games for Tijuana, posting an 8–3 record and 4.40 ERA. Barreda did not play in a game in 2020 due to the cancellation of the Mexican League season because of the COVID-19 pandemic.

Baltimore Orioles
On March 4, 2021, Barreda signed a minor league contract with the Baltimore Orioles organization. He was assigned to the Triple-A Norfolk Tides to begin the season. On September 7, 2021, Barreda was selected to the 40-man roster and promoted to the major leagues for the first time. Barreda made his MLB debut the next day at 32 years of age, and earned his first career win after pitching a shutout 8th inning against the Kansas City Royals. Barreda posted a 13.50 ERA in 3 appearances for Baltimore before he was designated for assignment on September 21 following the waiver claim of Joey Krehbiel. Barreda was assigned outright to Norfolk the following day. He was granted free agency on November 7.

Toros de Tijuana (fourth stint)
On March 17, 2022, Barreda signed with the Toros de Tijuana of the Mexican League for the 2022 season.

International career
Barreda was selected to the Mexico national baseball team at the 2020 Summer Olympics (contested in 2021).

References

External links

1988 births
Living people
Baltimore Orioles players
Gulf Coast Yankees players
Charleston RiverDogs players
Staten Island Yankees players
Tampa Yankees players
Atenienses de Manatí (baseball) players
Trenton Thunder players
Tomateros de Culiacán players
Huntsville Stars players
Brevard County Manatees players
Biloxi Shuckers players
Toros de Tijuana players
Cañeros de Los Mochis players
Gwinnett Braves players
Bowie Baysox players
Norfolk Tides players
Major League Baseball pitchers
Baseball players from Arizona
People from Sahuarita, Arizona
Baseball players at the 2020 Summer Olympics
Olympic baseball players of Mexico
2023 World Baseball Classic players